Chng Seng Mok (21 August 1950 – 26 September 2015) was a Singaporean sports shooter. He competed in the mixed trap event at the 1992 Summer Olympics.

References

External links
 
 

1950 births
2015 deaths
Singaporean male sport shooters
Olympic shooters of Singapore
Shooters at the 1992 Summer Olympics
Place of birth missing
Asian Games medalists in shooting
Asian Games bronze medalists for Singapore
Shooters at the 1990 Asian Games
Shooters at the 1994 Asian Games
Shooters at the 1998 Asian Games
Medalists at the 1990 Asian Games
Medalists at the 1998 Asian Games
20th-century Singaporean people